Evening Shade is a city in southwest Sharp County, Arkansas, United States. The population was down to 428 in 2021 and a strong EF2 tornado struck the north town on March 6, 2022,  impacting 2 houses.

History
Evening Shade was named in 1817 from the density of shade cast by the tall pine timber on an adjacent hill. It has frequently been noted on lists of unusual place names.

Geography
Evening Shade is located at  (36.070507, -91.621411).

Demographics

As of the census of 2000, there were 465 people, 204 households, and 137 families residing in the town. The racial makeup of the town was 98.49% White, and 1.51% from two or more races.  0.22% of the population were Hispanic or Latino of any race.

There were 204 households, out of which 28.9% had children under the age of 18 living with them, 53.9% were married couples living together, 10.3% had a female householder with no husband present, and 32.8% were non-families. 31.9% of all households were made up of individuals, and 17.2% had someone living alone who was 65 years of age or older.  The average household size was 2.28 and the average family size was 2.88.

In the town the population was spread out, with 25.2% under the age of 18, 6.7% from 18 to 24, 25.2% from 25 to 44, 24.9% from 45 to 64, and 18.1% who were 65 years of age or older.  The median age was 40 years. For every 100 females, there were 86.0 males.  For every 100 females age 18 and over, there were 84.1 males.

The median income for a household in the town was $24,500, and the median income for a family was $31,111. Males had a median income of $23,958 versus $15,833 for females. The per capita income for the town was $13,662.  About 8.1% of families and 10.9% of the population were below the poverty line, including 8.3% of those under age 18 and 23.2% of those age 65 or over.

Education 
Public education for early childhood, elementary and secondary school students is available from the Cave City School District, which includes the Evening Shade Math & Science Academy (kindergarten through grade 4) in Evening Shade, as well as Cave City Intermediate School, Cave City Middle School, and Cave City High School in Cave City.

On July 1, 2004 the Evening Shade School District was annexed into the Cave City School District.

Climate
The climate in this area is characterized by hot, humid summers and generally mild to cool winters.  According to the Köppen Climate Classification system, Evening Shade has a humid subtropical climate, abbreviated "Cfa" on climate maps.

References

Cities in Sharp County, Arkansas
Cities in Arkansas